This article lists the largest lakes, natural and man-made, in the United States by volume—the amount of water they contain under normal conditions. Volumes given for lakes shared with Canada and Mexico are for the total volume of the lake. Many lakes vary substantially in volume over time, especially man-made lakes, reservoirs, and lakes in arid areas. Capacity given is for normal or average lake level.

Note:  Volume estimates not available for Selawik and Naknek Lakes in Alaska.  They would undoubtedly rank on this list if data available.  Information other than otherwise noted from http://www.lakelubbers.com/, accessed 9 Mar 2011

See also

 List of lakes of the United States by area

References 

Lakes by volume
Lakes